Objestnost is a novel by Slovenian author Jurij Hudolin. It was first published in 2005.

See also
List of Slovenian novels

Slovenian novels
2005 novels